Zackheim is a surname. Notable people with the surname include:

Adrian Zackheim, American book editor
Michele Zackheim (born 1941), American writer and visual artist

See also
 Zakheim